The 2018 Odlum Brown Vancouver Open was a professional tennis tournament played on outdoor hard courts. It was the thirteenth (ATP) and sixteenth (ITF) editions of the tournament and was part of the 2018 ATP Challenger Tour and the 2018 ITF Women's Circuit. It took place in Vancouver, British Columbia, Canada, on 13–19 August 2018.

Men's singles main draw entrants

Seeds 

 1 Rankings as of 6 August 2018.

Other entrants 
The following players received a wildcard into the singles main draw:
  Ruben Bemelmans
  Vasek Pospisil
  Brayden Schnur
  Benjamin Sigouin

The following players received entry into the singles main draw using protected rankings:
  Santiago Giraldo
  Illya Marchenko

The following players received entry into the singles main draw as special exempts:
  Christopher Eubanks
  Lloyd Harris

The following players received entry from the qualifying draw:
  JC Aragone
  Dan Evans
  Borna Gojo
  Thai-Son Kwiatkowski

Women's singles main draw entrants

Seeds 

 1 Rankings as of 6 August 2018.

Other entrants 
The following players received a wildcard into the singles main draw:
  Françoise Abanda
  Gabriela Dabrowski
  Rebecca Marino
  Katherine Sebov

The following players received entry from the qualifying draw:
  Misaki Doi
  Julia Glushko
  Giuliana Olmos
  Martina Trevisan

The following player received entry as a lucky loser:
  Maryna Zanevska

Champions

Men's singles

 Dan Evans def.  Jason Kubler 4–6, 7–5, 7–6(7–3)

Women's singles

 Misaki Doi def.  Heather Watson 6–7(4–7), 6–1, 6–4

Men's doubles

 Luke Bambridge /  Neal Skupski def.  Marc Polmans /  Max Purcell 4–6, 6–3, [10–6].

Women's doubles

 Desirae Krawczyk /  Giuliana Olmos def.  Kateryna Kozlova /  Arantxa Rus, 6–2, 7–5

External links 
 Official website
 2018 Odlum Brown Vancouver Open at ITFtennis.com

2018 ITF Women's Circuit
2018 ATP Challenger Tour
2018 in Canadian tennis
Vancouver Open